Ixia viridiflora, also known as turquoise ixia, is a tall member of the genus Ixia. It comes from around the Tulbagh in South Africa, Cape Province. It has small corms under the ground.

This corn lily is a very rare plant. Its habitats are often destroyed by human influence so the conservation status of this interesting flower is vulnerable and is tending to worsen.

The name turquoise ixia refers to the spectacular blue-green turquoise colour of the flowers, which is a rare colour for flowers. They are grouped in long inflorescences and are traditionally star-shaped as in most corn lilies. They have a black-purple centre. The ovary is 3-locular. This flower is pollinated by specific scarab beetles known as monkey beetles of the tribe Hopliini.

The turquoise ixia has very good ornamental traits with its beautiful inflorescences but is very rare in cultivation because of its conservation status.

References

External links

viridiflora
Flora of the Cape Provinces
Garden plants of Southern Africa
Plants described in 1789